Stéphane Audran (born Colette Suzanne Dacheville; 8 November 1932 – 27 March 2018) was a French actress. She was known for her performances in award-winning films such as The Discreet Charm of the Bourgeoisie (1972) and Babette's Feast (1987), and in critically acclaimed films like The Big Red One (1980) and Violette Nozière (1978).

Biography
Audran was raised by her mother after her father, a doctor, died while she was young.  In 1964, she married director and screenwriter Claude Chabrol, after a short marriage to the actor Jean-Louis Trintignant. Her son by her marriage to Chabrol (which ended in 1980) is the actor Thomas Chabrol (born 1963).

Her first major role was in Chabrol's film Les Cousins (1959). She later appeared in most of Chabrol's films. Some of the more noteworthy of his films Audran appeared in were Les Bonnes Femmes (1960), La Femme Infidèle (1968), Les Biches (1968) as a wealthy bisexual who becomes involved in a ménage à trois (she first gained notice in this), Le Boucher (1970) as a school teacher in rural France, Juste Avant La Nuit (1971), and Violette Nozière (1978). She won the Silver Bear for Best Actress for her role in Les Biches at the 18th Berlin International Film Festival.

She also appeared in the first film of Éric Rohmer (Signe du Lion), and in films by Jean Delannoy (La Peau de Torpedo), Gabriel Axel (Babette's Feast, as the mysterious cook Babette), Bertrand Tavernier (Coup de Torchon, as the wife of the cop turned serial killer) and Samuel Fuller (The Big Red One). The most celebrated of her non-Chabrol  roles was as Alice Senechal in Luis Buñuel's Oscar-winning film Le charme discret de la bourgeoisie (1972).

Also appearing in English-language productions, Audran appeared in American features, including The Black Bird (1975), and in TV serials, including Brideshead Revisited (1981), Mistral's Daughter (1984) and The Sun Also Rises (1984). She starred in the 1974 film version of Agatha Christie's mystery And Then There Were None.

Audran won a French César Award for Best Supporting Actress for her performance in Violette Nozière (1978), and a British Film Academy award for her part in Just Before Nightfall (1975).

Death
Audran died around 2 a.m. on 27 March 2018, aged 85, following a long illness. Her son, Thomas Chabrol, reported that his mother had been in hospital for almost two weeks before she returned home, where she died.

Filmography

Film

Television

References

External links
 
 Stéphane Audran(Aveleyman)

1932 births
2018 deaths
People from Versailles
French film actresses
French television actresses
Silver Bear for Best Actress winners
20th-century French actresses
21st-century French actresses
Best Actress BAFTA Award winners
Best Supporting Actress César Award winners
Officers of the Ordre national du Mérite
Best Actress Robert Award winners
Signatories of the 1971 Manifesto of the 343